Simaima Taufa-Kautai (born 28 April 1994) is a rugby league footballer who plays as a  for the Parramatta Eels in the NRL Women's Premiership and Mounties RLFC in the NSWRL Women's Premiership.

She is an Australian and New South Wales representative.

Background
Taufa was born in Tonga and raised in Auckland, New Zealand, before moving to Sydney with her family.

She grew up playing rugby union, playing for the Western Sydney Two Blues in Sydney's Jack Scott Cup competition.

Playing career
In 2014, Taufa began playing rugby league for the Canley Heights Dragons. On 19 July 2014, she made her debut for New South Wales in a 10–26 loss to Queensland. On 9 November 2014, she made her Test debut for Australia in an 8–12 win over New Zealand.

On 27 September 2017, Taufa won the Dally M Female Player of the Year medal at the Dally M awards.

On 17 June 2018, Taufa was announced as one of fifteen marquee signings by the Sydney Roosters NRL Women's Premiership team. On 2 September 2018, she was named captain of the side.

In Round 1 of the 2018 NRL Women's season, she made her debut for the Roosters in a 4–10 loss to the New Zealand Warriors.

In 2020, Taufa joined the North Sydney Bears in the NSWRL Women's Premiership.

References

1994 births
Living people
Australian female rugby league players
Australia women's national rugby league team players
Australian sportspeople of Tongan descent
Rugby league locks
Rugby league props
Sydney Roosters (NRLW) players